The Angolan marsh rat (Dasymys nudipes) is a species of rodent in the family Muridae.
It is found in Angola, Botswana, Namibia, and Zambia.
Its natural habitats are subtropical or tropical seasonally wet or flooded lowland grassland and swamps.
It is threatened by habitat loss.

References

Dasymys
Rodents of Africa
Mammals described in 1870
Taxa named by Wilhelm Peters
Taxonomy articles created by Polbot